Lady, Behave! is a 1950 thriller novel by the British writer Peter Cheyney. It was the third part in a trilogy featuring Johnny Vallon, a hard-drinking former army officer now working as a private detective .

References

Bibliography
 James, Russell. Great British Fictional Detectives. Remember When, 21 Apr 2009.
 Reilly, John M. Twentieth Century Crime & Mystery Writers. Springer, 2015.

1950 British novels
Novels by Peter Cheyney
British thriller novels
Novels set in London
William Collins, Sons books